Journalism & Mass Communication Quarterly is a peer-reviewed academic journal that covers the field of communication and journalism. The editor-in-chief is Daniela Dimitrova (Iowa State University). The journal was established in 1924 as the Journalism Bulletin, the flagship journal of the Association of Education in Journalism and Mass Communication (AEJMC). It is published by SAGE Publications in association with the Association for Education in Journalism and Mass Communication.  It publishes original articles and book reviews on topics including theoretical and methodological developments in journalism and mass communication, international communication, media technologies and society, advertising, public relations, journalism history, media law and policy, media management and economics, political communication, and health communication.

This journal is a member of the Committee on Publication Ethics (COPE).

Articles in the Journalism and & Mass Communication Quarterly are available online before they are published in the print edition. Full abstracts are available online and articles can be purchased individually. Individuals may subscribe to the print edition and all AEJMC members receive a copy of the print journal and full access to online archives.

Abstracting and indexing 
The journal is abstracted and indexed in Scopus, EBSCO databases, ProQuest databases and the Social Sciences Citation Index. According to the Journal Citation Reports, its 2017 two-year impact factor is 1.706.

References

External links 
 

SAGE Publishing academic journals
English-language journals
Quarterly journals
Publications established in 1924
Media studies journals